George Henry Hamilton (April 4, 1875 – January 19, 1948) was president of the Federal Reserve Bank of Kansas City from 1932 to 1941.

Hamilton served three terms in the Illinois legislature.  In 1912 he purchased the State Savings Bank of Wichita, Kansas. After it merged with Fourth National Bank he rose to president of that bank.

He was a Wichita City commissioner from 1921 to 1922 and Wichita mayor in 1922.

After retiring from the bank on February 28, 1941, he returned to Wichita where he was a vice president at Fourth National Bank until his death.

References

1875 births
1948 deaths
Federal Reserve Bank of Kansas City presidents
Mayors of Wichita, Kansas
Members of the Illinois House of Representatives
People from Iroquois County, Illinois